The British Academy Children's Awards are presented in an annual award show hosted by the British Academy of Film and Television Arts (BAFTA). They have been awarded annually since 1996, before which time they were a part of the main British Academy Television Awards. It currently includes categories for television productions, feature films and video games.

The most recent ceremony, the 25th British Academy Children's Awards, was held on 27 November 2022 at Old Billingsgate in London, and was hosted by television presenter Lindsey Russell. The ceremony marked the return of the awards after a three-year absence due to the COVID-19 pandemic.

History
The awards were held for the first time in 1996, since then, the awards have been presented annually, with the exception 2020 and 2021, where the awards were not held due to the COVID-19 pandemic. Prior to 1996, productions targeted to children or young audiences were included in the British Academy Television Awards, from 1983 to 1996, two children-oriented categories, Children's Programme – Factual and Children's Programme – Fiction or Entertainment were presented. The last winners for those categories were CBBC's programme Short Change for the former and television movie Coping with Christmas for the latter.

The first edition featured seven competitive categories (Animation, Drama, Entertainment, Factual, Pre-School, Schools - Documentary, Schools - Drama), plus two special awards, one for film producer John Coates and the other for Lewis Rudd, who was head to the children's programming for ITV. The number of categories has varied through the editions with the creation of several categories such as International and Feature Film, both in 1999, Pre-School Animation and Presenter, both in 2000, and Game in 2007, among others. Until 2016, the awards also presented categories voted by the public through online voting, these included categories for feature film, television, video game and website.

Categories
As of 2022, the following fourteen competitive categories are presented:

 Animation
 Feature Film
 Pre-School – Animation
 Pre-School – Live Action
 Non-Scripted
 International
 Content for Change
 Game
 Scripted
 Game
 Performer
 Young Performer
 Director
 Writer

Current awards winners

Animation

Performer

Young Performer

Pre-School

Animation

Live Action

Presenter

Writer

Director

International

Feature Film

Game

Scripted

Non-Scripted

Content for Change

Special Award

Retired awards winners

Channel of the Year

Comedy

Drama

Entertainment

Factual

Factual Entertainment

Short Form

Independent Production Company

Interactive

Original
 2014: Dixi
 2015: Virry
 2016: Secret Life of Boys

Adapted
 2014: Disney Animated
 2015: The Dumping Ground: You're the Boss
 2016: Get Well Soon Hospital with Dr Ranj
 2017: Hey Duggee: We Love Animals

Learning

Primary

Secondary

Pre-School
Discontinued in 2000, for separate categories for live-action and animation.

 1996: Tots TV
 1997: Tots TV (Lapland Out)
 1998: Teletubbies
 1999: Tecwyn Y Tractor

Schools: Drama

Schools Factual

Primary
Discontinued in 2006 for Learning: Primary.

Secondary
Discontinued in 2006 for Learning: Secondary.

Interactive
Discontinued in 2014 for separate Interactive categories: Original and Adapted.

BAFTA Kids' Vote
Discontinued in 2009, for separate voting categories for feature film, television, video game and website.

Website
 2009: Club Penguin
 2010: Club Penguin
 2011: Bin Weevils
 2012: Bin Weevils
 2013: Bin Weevils
 2014: Bin Weevils

Feature Film

Television

Video Game

Writer

Adapted
Discontinued in 2006 for one sole Writer category.
 2004: Debbie Isitt (The Illustrated Mum)
 2005: Barbara Cox (Wipe Out)

Original
Discontinued in 2006 for one sole Writer category.
 2004: Tony Collingwood (Yoko! Jakamoko! Toto!)
 2005: John Godber and Jane Thornton (Scene - Oddsquad)

Breakthrough Talent
 2007: Charles Martin
 2008: Eliot Otis Brown Walters
 2009: Adam Shaw

CBBC Me and My Movie
 2008: The Prank
 2009: Vern's Vacation

BAFTA Young Game Designers
 2010: HAMSTER: Accidental World Domination
 2011: Rollin' Scotch

Game Concept
 2012: Vacuum Panic AKA Suck It Up

Game Making
 2012: Smiley Dodgems

Multiplatform
 2013: Kinect Sesame Street TV

Ceremonies

References

External links
 

Children's
Awards established in 1969
1969 establishments in the United Kingdom
Children's television awards
British children's entertainment
Annual events in the United Kingdom